Dinesh S. Thakur is an Indian mathematician and a professor of mathematics at University of Rochester. Before moving to Rochester, Thakur was a professor at University of Arizona. His main research interest is number theory.

Early life 
Thakur was born in Mumbai, India. He attended Balmohan Vidyamandir School in Bombay. He completed his undergraduate studies at Ruia College, University of Bombay. He got his Ph.D in 1987 at Harvard University under the guidance of Professor John Tate.

Career 
Thakur has spent three and half years at Institute for Advanced Study, Princeton and three years at Tata Institute of Fundamental Research, Bombay. He held positions at University of Minnesota and  University of Michigan. He moved to University of Arizona in 1993. He joined University of Rochester in July
2013. Thakur wrote a research monograph Function Field Arithmetic. Thakur has been serving on the editorial boards of Journal of Number Theory, International Journal of Number Theory, and P-adic Numbers, Ultrametric Analysis and Applications. Thakur is a founding member of-and for 15 years a participant in-the NSF-funded Southwest Center for Arithmetic Geometry and the Arizona Winter School.

He was elected as a member of the 2017 class of Fellows of the American Mathematical Society "for contributions to the arithmetic of function fields, exposition, and service to the mathematical community".

Work 
His main work has been in number theory, where he has been instrumental in developing various aspects of function field arithmetic and arithmetic geometry.

References

External links 
Home Page at University of Rochester
Function Field Arithmetic
Mathematics Genealogy
Rochester Faculty
List of publications

1961 births
Living people
21st-century Indian mathematicians
Fellows of the American Mathematical Society
Harvard Graduate School of Arts and Sciences alumni
Indian expatriates in the United States
Indian number theorists
Scientists from Maharashtra
University of Michigan faculty
University of Mumbai alumni
University of Rochester faculty